Crespellano is a  frazione of comune (municipality) of Valsamoggia in the Metropolitan City of Bologna in the Italian region Emilia-Romagna, located about  west of Bologna.

The main attraction is the Palazzo Garagnani, a former patrician villa of the Bentivoglio family of Bolognese lords.

The Italian painter Antonino Sartini was born in this place in 1889.

References 

Cities and towns in Emilia-Romagna